

Total result for Legislative Assembly

|}

Maps

Total result for Legislative Council

Parties represented under the category "Other candidates" include:
 People Power Party - 1.02%
 Australian Democrats - 0.83%
 Country Alliance - 0.45%
 Christian Democratic Party - 0.2%
 Socialist Alliance - 0.04%
 Independent candidates - 0.63%

Electoral Districts and Regions

Legislative Assembly results by District

Legislative Council results by Region

Eastern Metropolitan Region

Elected MPs: 
1st elected:	Richard Dalla-Riva (Liberal)
2nd elected:	Shaun Leane	(Labor)
3rd elected:	Bruce Atkinson (Liberal)
4th elected:	Brian Tee (Labor)
5th elected:	Jan Kronberg (Liberal)

Candidates from the Democratic Labor Party and the People Power Party also ran for the Eastern Metropolitan Region.

Eastern Victoria Region

Elected MPs: 
1st elected:	Philip Davis (Liberal)
2nd elected:	Matt Viney (Labor)
3rd elected:	Edward O'Donohue (Liberal)
4th elected:	Johan Scheffer (Labor)
5th elected:	Peter Hall (Nationals)

Candidates from: the Democratic Labor Party, the People Power Party, the Country Alliance and the Christian Democratic Party also ran for the Eastern Victoria Region, as did independent candidates.

Northern Metropolitan Region

Elected MPs: 
1st elected:	Theo Theophanous (Labor)
2nd elected:	Matthew Guy	(Liberal)
3rd elected:	Jenny Mikakos (Labor)
4th elected:	Greg Barber (Greens)
5th elected:	Nazih Elasmar (Labor)

Candidates from the Democratic Labor Party and the People Power Party also ran for the Northern Metropolitan Region, as did independent candidates.

Northern Victoria Region

Elected MPs: 
1st elected:	Candy Broad (Labor)
2nd elected:	Wendy Lovell (Liberal)
3rd elected:	Damian Drum (Nationals)
4th elected:	Donna Petrovich (Liberal)
5th elected:	Kaye Darveniza (Labor)

Candidates from: the Democratic Labor Party, the Country Alliance, the People Power Party and the Christian Democratic Party also ran for the Northern Victoria Region, as did independent candidates.

Southern Metropolitan Region

Elected MPs: 
 1st elected:	David Davis (Liberal)
 2nd elected:	John Lenders (Labor)
 3rd elected:	Andrea Coote (Liberal)
 4th elected:	Sue Pennicuik (Greens)
 5th elected:	Evan Thornley (Labor)

Candidates from the People Power Party and the Democratic Labor Party also ran for the Southern Metropolitan Region, as did independent candidates.

South Eastern Metropolitan Region

Elected MPs: 
 1st elected:	Gavin Jennings (Labor)
 2nd elected:	Gordon Rich-Phillips (Liberal)
 3rd elected:	Adem Somyurek (Labor)
 4th elected:	Inga Peulich (Liberal)
 5th elected:	Bob Smith (Labor)

Candidates from: the Democratic Labor Party, the People Power Party and the Christian Democratic Party also ran for the South Eastern Metropolitan Region, as did independent candidates.

Western Metropolitan Region

Elected MPs: 
 1st elected:	Justin Madden (Labor)
 2nd elected:	Bernie Finn (Liberal)
 3rd elected:	Khalil Eideh (Labor)
 4th elected:	Martin Pakula (Labor)
 5th elected:	Colleen Hartland (Greens)

Candidates from the Democratic Labor Party and the People Power Party also ran for the Western Metropolitan Region.

Western Victoria Region

Elected MPs 
1st elected:	Jaala Pulford (Labor)
2nd elected:	John Vogels (Liberal)
3rd elected:	Gayle Tierney (Labor)
4th elected:	David Koch (Liberal)
5th elected:	Peter Kavanagh (DLP)

Candidates from the Family First Party, the Country Alliance, the People Power Party and the Socialist Alliance also ran for the Western Victoria Region, as did independent candidates.

References

Elections in Victoria (Australia)
2006 elections in Australia